Site-specific performance is performance created in relation to a physical site and staged at the site itself (as opposed to a theatre space). It often involves research of the  site prior to the performance. It is often discussed in relation to both theatre and visual art traditions. Nick Kaye was one of the first scholars to consider site-specific performance from both theatrical and visual art perspectives in his book, Site-Specific Art: Performance, Place and Documentation.

References 

Theatre